The 1982–83 Honduran Liga Nacional season was the 17th edition of the Honduran Liga Nacional.  The format of the tournament remained the same as the previous season, with the exception that no final series were played.  Club Deportivo Olimpia won the title after finishing first in the final round and qualified to the 1983 CONCACAF Champions' Cup along with runners-up C.D. Motagua.

1982–83 teams

 Atlético Morazán (Tegucigalpa)
 Broncos UNAH (Choluteca)
 C.D. Dandy (San Pedro Sula, promoted)
 Independiente (San Pedro Sula)
 C.D. Marathón (San Pedro Sula)
 C.D. Motagua (Tegucigalpa)
 C.D. Olimpia (Tegucigalpa)
 Real C.D. España (San Pedro Sula)
 C.D. Victoria (La Ceiba)
 C.D.S. Vida (La Ceiba)

Regular season

Standings

Final round

Pentagonal standings

Final
 No final series was necessary as Olimpia won both regular season and final round.

Top scorer
  Luis O. Altamirano (Broncos UNAH) with 13 goals

Squads

Known results

Round 1

Round 2

Round 3

Round 4

Round 9

Round 14

Round 27
gol de Rodolfo Machado uruguayo jugador de Marathon

Pentagonal

Unknown rounds

References

Liga Nacional de Fútbol Profesional de Honduras seasons
1
Honduras